Beltia is a genus of leaf beetles in the subfamily Eumolpinae. It is known from the Neotropical realm. It was first erected by Martin Jacoby in 1881 for a single species from Nicaragua. In 2018, it was redefined to include fourteen new species from Central America and northwestern South America, as well as four species transferred from Colaspoides.

Species
 Beltia angustomarginata (Bechyné, 1953)
 Beltia awapita Flowers, 2018
 Beltia chiriquensis (Jacoby, 1882)
 Beltia confusa Flowers, 2018
 Beltia gorgona Flowers, 2018
 Beltia herreri Flowers, 2018
 Beltia ledesmae Flowers, 2018
 Beltia napoensis Flowers, 2018
 Beltia nicaraguensis Jacoby, 1881
 Beltia osa Flowers, 2018
 Beltia placidula (Bechyné, 1950)
 Beltia rugosa Flowers, 2018
 Beltia sanchezae Flowers, 2018
 Beltia talaga Flowers, 2018
 Beltia tilarana Flowers, 2018
 Beltia tisingalita Flowers, 2018
 Beltia tsachila Flowers, 2018
 Beltia vacilona Flowers, 2018
 Beltia weyrauchi (Bechyné, 1950)

References

Chrysomelidae genera
Eumolpinae
Beetles of North America
Beetles of South America
Taxa named by Martin Jacoby